Sergius of Samarkand, also known as Mār Sargīs or Mar Sergius, was an ascetic and missionary of the "Nestorian" Church of the East whom the Nestorian Christians considered a major saint. His name is associated with numerous locations in Central Asia. Not much is known about his life except that he had retreated to the Altai Mountains and, according to Mari ibn Suleiman's Book of the Tower and a letter written in about 1009 by Abdishō, the Metropolitan of Merv, to the Nestorian Patriarch John in Baghdad, Mar Sergius is responsible for the conversion of the Keraites.

Conversion legend 
The Keraites' conversion to East Syriac Christianity around the year 1007 AD was recorded in the 12th-century Book of the Tower by Mari ibn Suleiman, and the 13th-century  by Bar Hebraeus:

 wrote in Christians in Asia before 1500: "The name of the Christian saint he [the king] met is given as Mar Sergius, who, as we know, hailed from Samarkand and who became a very popular saint in Central and East Asia, various monasteries being dedicated to him."

See also 
 Barshabba
 Christianity in Central Asia
 Christianity among the Mongols
 Christianity among the Turkic peoples

References 

Assyrian Church of the East saints
Members of the Assyrian Church of the East
Christian ascetics
Christian missionaries in Central Asia
People from Samarkand
Date of birth unknown
Date of death unknown